Johan Vondriak Richter (4 December 1925 in Aarhus – 18 April 1998) was a Danish architect, royal city engineer and professor at the Aarhus School of Architecture.

Richter was originally trained as a carpenter but in 1947 he became a building constructor and in 1951 he graduated from the Royal Danish Academy of Fine Arts. He was initially employed at C. F. Møller Architects where he worked until 1955. However, while still working for C.F. Møller he opened the architects practice Richter & Gravers in 1953 with Arne Gravers. The company was later changed to Kjær & Richter when Gravers left the company and Werner Kjær became a new partner. One of the major works of the partnership was the Aarhus Concert Hall. Johan Richter was professor at the Aarhus School of Architecture from 1965 to 1985, functioned as the royal city engineer until 1996 and was the architect at Aarhus Cathedral from 1989.

In 1989 Richter was made an Honorary Fellow at the American Institute of Architects.

Awards 
 1965: Danish Wood Award (for Århus Statsgymnasium),
 1965: Eckersberg Medaillen
 1988: C.F. Hansen Medaillen
 1990: Thorsen-Prisen

References 

Danish architects
1925 births
1998 deaths
Royal Danish Academy of Fine Arts alumni
Recipients of the Eckersberg Medal
Recipients of the C.F. Hansen Medal
People from Aarhus